Hauerseter Sportsklubb is a Norwegian sports club from Nordkisa, Akershus. It has sections for association football, team handball, floorball, table tennis and cycling.

A club named Hauerseter SBK existed from 1922 to 1924. The current club was founded in 1929. Originally covering Hauerseter, the club also covered more of Nordkisa after the sports club there, Kisa SK, became a part of Ullensaker/Kisa IL. The club colors are red.

The men's football team currently plays in the Third Division, the fourth tier of Norwegian football. Its current stint stretches from 2012, with a highlight being the third place in 2014.

References

 Official site 

Football clubs in Norway
Defunct athletics clubs in Norway
Sport in Akershus
Ullensaker
Association football clubs established in 1929
1929 establishments in Norway